Gábor Bardi (born 20 November 1978) is a Hungarian former professional footballer who played as a goalkeeper.

Honours
APOP Kinyras
 Cypriot Cup: 2008–09
 Cypriot Second Division: 2006–07

References

1978 births
Living people
Footballers from Budapest
Hungarian footballers
Association football goalkeepers
Hungarian expatriate footballers
Újpest FC players
Zalaegerszegi TE players
Expatriate footballers in Finland
FC Lahti players
Hungarian expatriate sportspeople in Finland
Expatriate footballers in Cyprus
AEP Paphos FC players
Hungarian expatriate sportspeople in Cyprus
Hévíz FC footballers
APOP Kinyras FC players
Nemzeti Bajnokság I players
Cypriot First Division players
Veikkausliiga players
21st-century Hungarian people